Woolly lousewort is a common name for several plants and may refer to:

Pedicularis dasyantha, native to Europe
Pedicularis lanata, native to Canada and Alaska